Aleksandr Leonidovich Bogatyryov (born 6 March 1963 in Biysk; died 12 July 2009 in Biysk) was a Kazakhstani football player of Russian  origin.

Honours
Kairat
Kazakhstan Premier League champion: 1992
Kazakhstan Cup winner: 1992

External links

References

1963 births
People from Biysk
2009 deaths
Soviet footballers
FC Tom Tomsk players
FC Dynamo Barnaul players
FC Dynamo Stavropol players
FC Kairat players
FC Metalurh Zaporizhzhia players
Kazakhstani footballers
Kazakhstan international footballers
FC Tekstilshchik Kamyshin players
Russian Premier League players
Kazakhstan Premier League players
Kazakhstani expatriate footballers
Expatriate footballers in Russia

Association football forwards